Lyngen may refer to:

Places
Lyngen, a municipality in Troms county, Norway
Lyngen (fjord), a fjord in Troms county, Norway
Lyngen Alps, a mountain range in Troms county, Norway
Lyngen Church, a church in Lyngen municipality in Troms county, Norway
Lyngen Peninsula, a peninsula in Troms county, Norway

Other
Lyngen horse, a horse breed originating in Northern Norway
Lyngen Line, a defensive line in Norway during Operation Nordlicht in World War II
Lyngen/Karnes IL, a sports club in Lyngen municipality in Troms county, Norway